The Great Northern Tower is a  sloped highrise apartment building located on Watson Street in Manchester city centre, England. The building was proposed in 2001 and construction began in 2004 with completion in 2007. The total cost of the development was £32,800,000 and comprises 257 apartments. It was designed by Assael Architecture and built by Carillion.

The sloped style of the building was designed to complement the curved roof of the adjacent Manchester Central Convention Complex, and create a distinctive silhouette to the Manchester skyline. Clad in glass, metal, and grey tiles, the tower slopes in profile from 10 to 25 storeys, has two levels in the basement.

References

External links
A Manchester View entry
Emporis entry
Assael entry
Great Northern Tower website

Residential skyscrapers in England
Skyscrapers in Manchester
Apartment buildings in England
History of Manchester
Residential buildings completed in 2007
Residential buildings in Manchester